Louis Del Valle (born July 13, 1968 in Long Island City, New York) is an American boxer and the former WBA light heavyweight title holder. He is currently the boxing trainer of former super middleweight champion, Badou Jack.

Professional career
Known as "Honey Boy", Del Valle turned pro in 1992 and won his first 22 bouts, setting up a shot at long-time WBA light heavyweight champion Virgil Hill in 1996. Hill won a close unanimous decision.  In 1997 he took on Eddy Smulders for the vacant WBA light heavyweight title and won via 8th-round TKO. He lost the belt in his next fight, a clear decision loss to Roy Jones Jr. in a WBC/WBA unification bout, but became the first fighter ever to knock Jones down.

In 2001 he took on Bruno Girard for vacant WBA light heavyweight title, but came up short of the title in a draw. In 2002 he rematched Girard for the same belt, but lost a split decision.

De Leon Tinsley (9-3-1), on July 18, 2008 won a unanimous decision over Del Valle (36-6-1), 40, in the 8-round bout at Mahi Temple Auditorium. Judges Stu Winston and Fred Flutie scored the bout for Tinsley as did Bill Ray (77-75). Tinsley weighed 189 pounds while Del Valle came in at 198.

Professional boxing record

See also
List of world light-heavyweight boxing champions
List of Puerto Rican boxing world champions

References

External links

 

|-

|-

1968 births
Living people
American male boxers
Boxers from New York City
People from Long Island City, Queens
American sportspeople of Puerto Rican descent
Light-heavyweight boxers
World light-heavyweight boxing champions
World Boxing Association champions
American boxing trainers